The Mid-America Intercollegiate Athletics Association (MIAA) is a college athletic conference affiliated with the National Collegiate Athletic Association (NCAA) at the Division II level, headquartered in Kansas City, Missouri. Its fourteen member institutions, located in Kansas, Missouri, Nebraska, and Oklahoma, include twelve public and two private schools. The MIAA is a 501(c)(3) nonprofit organization incorporated in Missouri.

Originally named the Missouri Intercollegiate Athletic Association, the conference was established in 1912 with 14 members, two of which are still current members. Six members (Central Methodist, Central Wesleyan, Culver–Stockton, Missouri Valley, Missouri Wesleyan, Tarkio College, Westminster, and William Jewell) were later removed from the conference in 1924 when it decided to only include the public schools. A majority of the charter members that left in 1924 have shut down their operations, or merged with another school. Over the next century, nearly twenty schools have joined and left the conference, with a few affiliate members. Some of those schools have reclassified to NCAA Division I.

The conference's current 14-campus makeup resulted when Newman University and Rogers State University joined the conference in 2019 after departing the Heartland Conference.

The current MIAA commissioner is Mike Racy.

History and overview

The MIAA currently sponsors 20 sports – ten men's and ten women's. MIAA schools with additional sports compete independently or as part of a nearby conference. On July 1, 1992, the MIAA entered a new era when the conference changed its name from the Missouri Intercollegiate Athletic Association to the Mid-America Intercollegiate Athletics Association. The name change originated in 1989, when Pittsburg State University and Washburn University became the first schools outside the state of Missouri to gain membership in the MIAA.

Founding and former members
The MIAA was established in 1912 with 14 member institutions. It included the five state teachers colleges in Missouri – Warrensburg Teachers College (now the University of Central Missouri), Northeast Missouri State Teachers College (now Truman State University), Northwest Missouri State Teacher's College (now Northwest Missouri State University), Southeast Missouri State Teacher's College (now Southeast Missouri State University), and Southwest Missouri State Teacher's College (now Missouri State University). It also included nine private schools – Central Methodist University, Central Wesleyan College, Culver–Stockton College, Drury University, Missouri Valley College, Missouri Wesleyan College, Tarkio College, Westminster College, and William Jewell College. Only Central Missouri and Northwest Missouri State remain members in the MIAA.

In 1924 the conference reorganized to include only public schools, and conference records tend to begin with that date. The schools left behind in the reorganization went on to later form the Missouri College Athletic Union, which would in time become the current Heart of America Athletic Conference in the NAIA.

First expansions of the conference
The Missouri School of Mines, later the University of Missouri–Rolla and now the Missouri University of Science & Technology, joined in 1935 to bring membership to six schools.  The membership remained at six until Lincoln University joined in 1970, followed by the University of Missouri–St. Louis in 1980.

1980s
Southwest Missouri State left the MIAA after the 1980–81 season to move on to NCAA Division I. In 1986, Southwest Baptist University brought the conference membership back to eight schools. In 1989, Pittsburg State, Washburn, Missouri Southern State College and Missouri Western State College – formerly members of the Central States Intercollegiate Conference – began competition in the 1989–90 season.

1990s and 2000s

Southeast Missouri State left the MIAA following the 1990–91 season to move on to NCAA Division I, and was replaced by Emporia State University in the 1991–92 season. Missouri–St. Louis left the MIAA in 1996, as did Missouri–Rolla in 2005. Lincoln forfeited membership in 1999.

Fort Hays State University joined the MIAA in 2006 and the University of Nebraska Omaha entered the league in 2008.

On July 3, 2007, Southwest Baptist was granted independent status for their football team, while all remaining teams will stay in the MIAA.

On July 8, 2009, the MIAA CEO Council voted to remain a 12-team league for the foreseeable future, denying an application by Rockhurst University (which does not have a football team but wanted to compete in other sports). The vote ended short term speculation about the League expanding to 16 teams divided into two divisions.

2010–present

Lincoln rejoined the conference in 2010 and in that same year, the MIAA CEO Council voted to extend invitations to the University of Central Oklahoma and Northeastern State University to become members of the league beginning in 2012–13, as well as Lindenwood University and the University of Nebraska at Kearney. In 2012, the schools started to only play each other in football and play no non-conference games. At first, the teams that were closest geographically played each other every year and would rotate through the other conference members in other years. The move to expand the league was spurred at least in part after Northwest Missouri during its national championship game run had problems finding non-conference teams that would play it resulting in 2010 with it having 10-game rather than 11-game schedule. In 2011, Nebraska–Omaha joined the Summit League and moved to Division I after the 2010–11 season.

As Nebraska–Omaha departed in 2011, the membership of the MIAA downsized to 11. Central Oklahoma, Northeastern State, Nebraska–Kearney, and Lindenwood all joined in 2012–13, pushing the membership to 15. The league returned to 14 institutions when Truman left in 2013 to join the Great Lakes Valley Conference (GLVC).

Southwest Baptist rejoined the MIAA in football for the 2013 football season, which meant that the schools would then play an 11-game conference football schedule with no non-conference games.  In 2014, Southwest Baptist and Lincoln joined the GLVC for football only. This puts it so that all of the football schools in the MIAA can play each other now, instead of rotating.

On February 8, 2018, Newman University announced that it had accepted an invitation to join the league as an associate member in all 14 sports it sponsors beginning with the 2019–20 athletic season. On May 31, 2018, the MIAA announced that Southwest Baptist would be withdrawing its membership from the MIAA to join the Great Lakes Valley Conference full-time, effective August 1, 2019. Lindenwood followed Southwest Baptist on October 4, 2018 announcing they would be joining the GLVC as well, effective July 1, 2019. On October 18, 2018 Rogers State University in Claremore, Oklahoma announced that it would be joining the league as an associate member, aborting a move to the Lone Star Conference. They became full members on July 1, 2022.

After more than 25 years at its current office at 17th and Main Streets, The MIAA announced that it was moving its offices to the newly renovated Hy-Vee Arena, which is formerly known as Kemper Arena.

MIAA and GAC announced a partnership in June 2018 to combine their men’s tennis and men’s soccer leagues in both sports from 2019–20 academic year. Under the agreement, the MIAA will organize the tennis league and the GAC will organize the soccer.

Commissioners
In July 1981, Ken B. Jones was appointed as the first full-time MIAA commissioner. He held the position for 16 years, retiring in 1997. Ralph McFillen succeeded Jones, serving 10 years until retiring in 2007. Jim Johnson then succeeded McFillen in July 2007 and served as commissioner until September 2010. Bob Boerigter succeeded Johnson on September 20, 2010 as commissioner and retired on January 27, 2017. On September 7, 2016, it was announced that Mike Racy would become the fifth commissioner of the MIAA, effective January 30, 2017.

Chronological timeline
 1912 – The Mid-America Intercollegiate Athletics Association (MIAA) was founded as the Missouri Intercollegiate Athletic Association. Charter members included Missouri – Warrensburg Teachers College (now the University of Central Missouri), Missouri State Normal School of the First District (now Truman State University), Missouri State Normal School of the Fifth District (now Northwest Missouri State University), Missouri State Normal School of the Third District (now Southeast Missouri State University), Missouri State Normal School of the Fourth District (now Missouri State University), Central College of Missouri (now Central Methodist University), Central Wesleyan College, Christian University of Missouri (now Culver–Stockton College), Drury College (now Drury University), Missouri Valley College, Missouri Wesleyan College, Tarkio College, Westminster College and William Jewell College, effective beginning the 1912–13 academic year.
 1924 – Central Methodist, Central Wesleyan, Culver–Stockton, Drury, Missouri Valley, Missouri Wesleyan, Tarkio, Westminster (Mo.) and William Jewell left the MIAA to form the Missouri College Athletic Union (MCAU), effective after the 1923–24 academic year.
 1935 – The Missouri School of Mines and Metallurgy (later the University of Missouri–Rolla, now the Missouri University of Science and Technology (Missouri S&T)) joined the MIAA, effective in the 1935–36 academic year.
 1957 – The MIAA was granted dull membership status within the National Collegiate Athletic Association (NCAA) at the College Division ranks, effective in the 1957–58 academic year.
 1970 – Lincoln University of Missouri joined the MIAA, effective in the 1970–71 academic year.
 1980 – The University of Missouri at St. Louis joined the MIAA, effective in the 1980–81 academic year.
 1981 – Southwest Missouri State (now Missouri State) left the MIAA to become an NCAA D-II Independent (which would later join the Division I ranks of the National Collegiate Athletic Association (NCAA) and the Association of Mid-Continent Universities (AMCU, now the Summit League), effective beginning the 1982–83 academic year), effective after the 1980–81 academic year.
 1986 – Southwest Baptist University joined the MIAA, effective in the 1986–87 academic year.
 1989 – Missouri Southern State College (now Missouri Southern State University), Missouri Western State College (now Missouri Western State University), Pittsburg State University and Washburn University joined the MIAA, effective in the 1989–90 academic year.
 1991 – Southeast Missouri State left the MIAA to join the NCAA Division I ranks and the Ohio Valley Conference (OVC), effective after the 1990–91 academic year.
 1991 – Emporia State University joined the MIAA, effective in the 1991–92 academic year.
 1992 – The MIAA has been rebranded as the Mid-America Intercollegiate Athletics Association (MIAA), effective in the 1992–93 academic year.
 1996 – Missouri–St. Louis (UMSL) left the MIAA to join the Great Lakes Valley Conference (GLVC), effective after the 1995–96 academic year.
 1999 – Lincoln (Mo.) left the MIAA to join the Heartland Conference, effective after the 1998–99 academic year.
 2005 – Missouri–Rolla (UMR, now Missouri S&T) left the MIAA to join the GLVC, effective after the 2004–05 academic year.
 2006 – Fort Hays State University joined the MIAA, effective in the 2006–07 academic year.
 2008 – The University of Nebraska at Omaha joined the MIAA, effective in the 2008–09 academic year.
 2010 – Lincoln (Mo.) re-joined back to the MIAA, effective in the 2010–11 academic year.
 2011 – Nebraska–Omaha left the MIAA to join the NCAA Division I ranks as an NCAA D-I Independent (which would later join the Summit League, effective beginning the 2012–13 academic year), effective after the 2010–11 academic year.
 2012 – The University of Central Oklahoma, Lindenwood University, the University of Nebraska at Kearney and Northeastern State University joined the MIAA, effective in the 2012–13 academic year.
 2012 – Harding University, Southern Nazarene University and Upper Iowa University joined the MIAA as affiliate members for men's soccer, effective in the 2012 fall season (2012–13 academic year).
 2013 – Truman State (formerly Northeast Missouri State) left the MIAA to join the GLVC, effective after the 2012–13 academic year.
 2015 – Harding and Southern Nazarene left the MIAA as affiliate members for men's soccer, effective after the 2014 fall season (2014–15 academic year).
 2016 – Elmhurst College, Maryville University, McKendree University and Nebraska Wesleyan University (with Drury re-joining for that sport) joined the MIAA as affiliate members for women's bowling, effective in the 2017 spring season (2016–17 academic year).
 2019 – Lindenwood and Southwest Baptist left the MIAA to join the GLVC, effective after the 2018–19 academic year.
 2019 – Six institutions left the MIAA as affiliate members: Drury, Elmhurst, Maryville, McKendree and Nebraska Wesleyan for women's bowling; and Upper Iowa for men's soccer, all effective after the 2018–19 academic year.
 2019 – Newman University and Rogers State University joined the MIAA as associate members for all sports, effective in the 2019–20 academic year.
 2022 – Newman and Rogers State were granted to upgrade for full membership, effective in the 2022–23 academic year.

Member schools

Current members
The MIAA currently has 14 full members, all but one are public schools:

Notes

Former members
The MIAA had 17 former full members, all but six were private schools. School names and nicknames listed here reflect those used in the final school year each institution was an MIAA member.

Notes

Former affiliate members
The MIAA had eight former affiliate members, all were private schools:

Notes

Membership timeline

Sports
The Mid-America Intercollegiate Athletics Association sponsors championship competition in ten men's and nine women's NCAA sanctioned sports.

Men's sponsored sports by school

Women's sponsored sports by school

Notes

Other sponsored sports by school

Facilities

NCAA Division II team championships

Championships

Football

MIAA Championships won or shared per school

MIAA all-time standings (1924–2022)

MIAA Champions

Volleyball
The MIAA champion was determined via postseason tournament from 1982 to 1992, and 2006 to 2007. From 2003 to 2005, separate regular season and tournament champions were crowned.

MIAA Championships per school

MIAA Champions

Men's basketball

MIAA Regular Season champions
 – first place in MIAA standings, no championship awardedN – North Division Champion (89–90 only)S – South Division Champion (89–90 only)

MIAA Tournament champions

Women's basketball

MIAA Regular Season champions
N – North Division Champion (89–90 only)S – South Division Champion (89–90 only)

Baseball
MIAA Championships won or shared per school

MIAA Champions

MIAA Tournament Champions

Softball
MIAA Championships won or shared per school

MIAA Champions By Year

MIAA Tournament Champions By Year

Wrestling
MIAA Championships won or shared by school
(prior to 2012, all championships were decided by the tournament champions)

Men's golf

MIAA Championships won or shared by school

Women's golf

MIAA Championships won or shared by school

Men's tennis

MIAA Championships won or shared by school
(prior to 2010, the conference championships was awarded to the tournament champions)

Women's tennis

MIAA Championships won or shared by school
(prior to 2010, the conference championships was awarded to the tournament champions)

Men's indoor track and field

MIAA Championships won or shared by school

Women's indoor track and field

MIAA Championships won or shared by school

See also
2016 Mid-America Intercollegiate Athletics Association football season

References

External links

 
Organizations based in Kansas City, Missouri
Sports organizations established in 1912
Articles which contain graphical timelines
1912 establishments in the United States